

Arda Denkel (6 July 1949 – 21 May 2000) was a Turkish philosopher. He studied at the University of Oxford  and, under Peter Strawson, wrote his D.Phil. dissertation which he later developed into a more expansive study with his book The Natural Background of Meaning in 1999.

Upon his return to Turkey he became an important promoter of analytical philosophy in Turkey, a country traditionally almost entirely cultivated within a continental atmosphere, and became a faculty member in the philosophy department at the Boğaziçi University in Istanbul for the rest of his life.

He was twice a visiting professor at the University of Wisconsin between 1985 and 1989, and served as a member of the steering committee of the European Society for Analytic Philosophy (ESAP) between 1996 and 1999.

He also authored several other books and articles in both Turkish and English, including his Object and Property in 1996. He died in 2000 after a prolonged fight with a brain tumour.

Books
1981| Anlaşma: Anlatma ve Anlama

1984| Bilginin Temelleri

1984| Anlamın Kökeni

1986| Nesne ve Doğası

1995| Reality and Meaning: A Particularistic Point of View

1995| Reality and Meaning 

1996| Anlam ve Nedensellik

1997| Düşünceler ve Gerekçeler I

1997| Düşünceler ve Gerekçeler II

1998| İlkçağ’da Doğa Felsefeleri

1999| The Natural Background of Meaning

References

20th-century Turkish philosophers
Analytic philosophers
Epistemologists
Philosophers of language
Metaphysicians
1949 births
2000 deaths